The Hill's Rising (or simply Rising is an American daily news and opinion web series produced by Washington, D.C. political newspaper The Hill. The series is available on The Hill website and YouTube. 

Gradually gaining popularity on YouTube throughout 2019 and 2020, the show's longest-serving hosts were Krystal Ball and Saagar Enjeti, until their departure in May 2021. The current hosts are journalist Robby Soave and commentator Briahna Joy Gray, while Batya Ungar-Sargon also fills in for Gray.

About 
Rising features commentary and analysis of political news and current events, in-studio interviews with politicians, campaign staff and surrogates, political advisors and strategists, and members of the news media. When Ball and Enjeti hosted, the show presented a synthesis of populist left and populist right viewpoints.

The series is available on The Hills website, YouTube, and a streaming channel.

Format 
Rising typically produces five episode a week, Monday-Friday. There are usually about eight pre-taped segments per episode. Each host presents a "radar" segment which analyze current events and present commentary in a monologue format, usually organized into three or four bullet-points. This is followed by an open discussion.

History 

In 2018, The Hill announced Krystal Ball and Buck Sexton as presenters of a new slate of original programming to be produced by John Solomon. Rising launched in June 2018 as Rising with Krystal & Buck with Buck Sexton as host. Sexton departed in June 2019, with Saagar Enjeti replacing him. In the press release, Ball was slated as the "progressive co-host on a morning show with a conservative co-host". The show focused on attacking "establishment Democrats such as Joe Biden and Pete Buttigieg."

In late 2019, it had an average of 600,000 viewers daily. , the Hill's YouTube channel averaged 1.48 million views per day, and had around 1.2 million subscribers. Enjeti and Ball also co-authored a book, The Populist's Guide to 2020: A New Right and New Left Are Rising. In 2020, the show did a few live-stream analysis programs for important political events like the 2020 Democratic primary and the 2020 general elections.

In March 2022, YouTube suspended Risings channel for seven days for allegedly "violating the platform's rules around election misinformation". Then-Rising host Ryan Grim stated in The Intercept: "Two infractions were cited: First, the outlet posted the full video of former President Donald Trump's recent speech at the Conservative Political Action Conference on its page. Second, Rising played a minutelong clip of Trump's commentary on Russia's invasion of Ukraine, which included the claim that none of it would have happened if not for a “rigged election.”"

2021–2022 host changes 
In May 2021, Ball and Enjeti announced they were departing Rising in order to release their own independent project, Breaking Points with Krystal and Saagar. They were temporarily replaced with Ryan Grim and The Federalist editor Emily Jashinsky. In July, Kim Iversen took over from Jashinsky, who said on Twitter that she had never intended to do Rising full time.

In 2022, Briahna Joy Gray joined Rising as a new host. The current hosts are Gray and Soave. With the current slate of hosts: Gray represents the progressive left, and Soave represents libertarian political ideologies. Batya Ungar-Sargon also fills in for Gray.

Iversen left the show in July 2022 after being excluded from participating in an interview with Anthony Fauci, whom she had previously been critical of.

Grim and Jashinsky, who were the regular Friday hosts of Rising, resigned in September 2022. Also in September 2022, Rising refused to air a segment on their show in which left-wing political commentator Katie Halper called Israel an "apartheid government". She was subsequently fired from the show.

Hosts

References

External links 
 
 
 

Political mass media in the United States
Internet properties established in 2018